British Guinea or Colony of Bolama and Bolama River, was a colony of the United Kingdom in West Africa. Its capital was in the city of Bolama.

The colony was founded in 1792, but was incorporated, after arbitration, into Portuguese Guinea in 1870. It basically comprised the islands adjacent to the island of Bolama, in the Bijagós Archipelago, and the strips of land on the banks of the Buba River.

Its territories are currently components of the independent nation Guinea-Bissau.

History 
Guinea was already being gradually explored by the Portuguese from 1490 in Cacheu, from 1615 in Bafatá, from 1641 in Farim and from 1697 in Bissau. In this period, all the lands north of the Geba river were already colonized by Portugal. However, the Portuguese only became interested in the island of Bolama in 1753, and even so they did not start colonization.

Beginning of British colonization 
The Portuguese lack of interest in the island of Bolama and the Bijagós Archipelago opened opportunities for, on May 10, 1792, two British naval officers, Lieutenants Philip Beaver and Henry Dalrymple, to apply for a concession in London to found a model colony in island of Bolama (scarcely inhabited and apparently available for European settlement). After Darlymple gave up, Filippe Beaver, on July 27, 1792, bought the ownership rights to Bolama's land, acquiring them from the king of Canhabaque. After the acquisition, he established a village with a population of 275 British, in the region of Ponta Oeste, current village of Bolama de Baixo, becoming the first colonial ruler of British Guinea. On November 29 of the same year he and the 275 Britons left the village. Bolama started to serve as the mooring coast for British ships that sailed between the Gambia and Sierra Leone.

In 1816 Joseph Scott carried out an expedition to try to re-establish the village of Bolama, but he encountered resistance from the Bijagós peoples, who repopulated the island. Commander Scott gave up on colonizing the island and preferred to travel to Sierra Leone.

Conflict for possession of Bolama

On June 24, 1827, the British colonial governor of Sierra Leone Neil Campbell, in an expedition to the island of Bolama and the Buba River, signed treaties ratifying the possession of Bolama with the kings of Bolola and Guinala. However, in opposition to the British, less than a year later, on July 12, 1828, King Damião, of the Kingdom of Canhabaque, and ambassadors of King Fabião, of the Kingdom of the Beafadas, signed a treaty authorizing the occupation of Bolama by the Portuguese. On May 9, 1830, Joaquim António de Mattos began the Portuguese military occupation of Bolama, the island's first permanent colony. Slave trading factories are built in Bolama. Portuguese colonization and the slave trade generated diplomatic reaction from the British.

Between 1838 and 1859 the British attacked Bolama, Portuguese military posts and slave transport vessels, starting the Bolama Conflict, of a military and diplomatic nature. Some of these attacks managed to briefly occupy the island, sometimes freeing slaves, sometimes imprisoning Portuguese soldiers, in an unprecedented conflict in relations between Portugal and Great Britain, surpassed in diplomatic terms (but not in military escalation) later only by the dispute known as the Rose-Coloured Map.

In February 1859 the British made their last and most destructive attack on the Bolama facility, causing the Portuguese to abandon the island. Thus, on May 10, 1860, the British colonial governor of Sierra Leone proclaims the restoration of British Guinea, but under the administration of the Colony and Protectorate of Sierra Leone. On December 3, 1860 Stephen Hill, governor of Sierra Leone, visits Bolama and establishes a fixed military contingent. On December 14, 1861, the British colony of Bolama was inaugurated.

Arbitration and change of sovereignty
In 1868 the British government agrees to submit the Bolama question to international arbitration. However, it was only on April 21, 1870 that such dispute was resolved by arbitration award of the President of the United States, Ulysses Grant, which gave Portugal victory, determining that the British withdraw from the region. The Portuguese representative at the arbitration court was António José de Ávila who, after the victory, won the title of Duke of Ávila and Bolama.

On October 1, 1870, the Bolama transfer of sovereignty ceremony takes place, with the lowering of the British flag; then, the Portuguese flag was hoisted in Bolama, symbolizing the end of the conflict.

References

Guinea, Bolama

Former Portuguese colonies
Former British colonies
English-speaking countries and territories
Former British protectorates